Jerjer Q. Gibson (born 14 March 1991), or simply Jerjer, is a Liberian professional indoor soccer player.

Previously, Gibson played professionally for the Syracuse Silver Knights. 

Gibson joined the Harrisburg Heat on 16 May 2019.

Career 
On October 5, 2017 the St. Louis Ambush announced they signed him for the upcoming season.

Personal
Jerjer is the son of Aseneth Gibson and Alfred Gibson who are all Liberian natives.

References

External links
Jerjer Gibson Profile

1991 births
Association football midfielders
Expatriate soccer players in the United States
Living people
Liberian expatriate footballers
Liberian footballers
Major Arena Soccer League players
National Premier Soccer League players
USL League Two players
Soccer players from San Francisco
Soccer players from Pennsylvania
Sportspeople from Monrovia
St. Louis Ambush (2013–) players
Syracuse Silver Knights players
Wilmington Wildcats men's soccer players
Harrisburg Heat (MASL) players
People from South San Francisco, California
Sportspeople from Lancaster, Pennsylvania
Baltimore Blast players
Virginia Beach Piranhas players
Virginia Beach City FC players